Roman Hauk (born 15 April 1999) is a German footballer who plays as a centre-back for FC Astoria Walldorf.

Career
Hauk made his professional debut for SV Sandhausen in the 2. Bundesliga on 21 June 2020, coming on as a substitute in the 55th minute for Gerrit Nauber in the home match against Dynamo Dresden, which finished as a 0–1 loss.

He joined FC Astoria Walldorf on 1 July 2020.

References

External links
 
 
 
 

1999 births
Living people
People from Bretten
Sportspeople from Karlsruhe (region)
Footballers from Baden-Württemberg
German footballers
Association football central defenders
SV Sandhausen players
FC Astoria Walldorf players
2. Bundesliga players
Regionalliga players